The Free Confederation of Mauritanian Workers (CLTM) is a national trade union center in Mauritania. It is affiliated with the International Trade Union Confederation.

References

Trade unions in Mauritania
International Trade Union Confederation
International Confederation of Arab Trade Unions
Economy of the Arab League